Leonard Koren (born January 4, 1948) is an American artist, aesthetics expert and writer.

Life and work
Leonard Koren was born in New York City in 1948, and raised in Los Angeles. In 1969, he co-founded the Los Angeles Fine Arts Squad, a mural painting group. He attended UCLA, graduating with a Master's Degree in Architecture and Urban Planning in 1972. After graduation, Koren worked as an artist in Los Angeles, where his work focused on bathing environments.

In 1976, Koren founded WET Magazine – a periodical dedicated to gourmet bathing, which was influential in the development of postmodern aesthetics. In 1981, WET magazine ceased publication, and Koren moved to Japan, where he wrote several works on aesthetics. From 1983 through 1986 produced a column on Cultural Anthropology for a Japanese magazine. In particular, Koren wrote Wabi-Sabi for Artists, Designers, Poets and Philosophers, which helped bring the Japanese concept of Wabi-Sabi into western aesthetic theory. Currently Koren lives in San Francisco.

References

External links
 Leonard Koren Personal Website
 Wet Magazine

American landscape architects
American expatriates in Japan
American magazine editors
UCLA School of the Arts and Architecture alumni
Living people
1948 births
American columnists
Writers from the San Francisco Bay Area
American magazine founders
Writers from Los Angeles
Writers from New York City
Artists from New York City
Artists from Los Angeles
Artists from San Francisco
20th-century American architects